The Avonbeg River rises on the northern flank of Camenabologue in the Wicklow Mountains and flows southeast into the valley of Glenmalure. It continues southeast through the villages of Greenan and Ballinaclash before joining the Avonmore at the Meeting of the Waters (Cumar an dá Uisce) to form the River Avoca, which in turn discharges into the Irish Sea at Arklow. From source to sea the river remains in East Wicklow. Avonbeg Road, Avonbeg Drive, Avonbeg Park and Avonbeg Gardens in Tallaght, Dublin are named after the river.

See also
Rivers of Ireland

Rivers of County Wicklow
Tributaries of the River Avoca